The Victoria & Alfred (V&A) Waterfront in Cape Town is situated on the Atlantic shore, Table Bay Harbour, the City of Cape Town and Table Mountain. Adrian van der Vyver designed the complex.

Situated in South Africa's oldest working harbour, the  area has been developed for mixed-use, with both residential and commercial real estate.

The Waterfront attracts more than 23 million visitors a year.

History
Prince Alfred, second son of Queen Victoria, visited the Cape Colony harbour in 1860 as a sixteen-year-old Royal Navy Midshipman on HMS Euryalus. He made a big splash with the colonials on this first-ever visit by a member of the Royal Family. The first basin of the new Navy Yard was named after him and the second after his mother.

On the 25 August 1998 the Planet Hollywood bombing took place at the (now closed) Planet Hollywood restaurant within the V&A killing 2 people and injuring 26 more.

Outlets

The complex houses over 450 retail outlets, including fashion, homeware and curios, jewellery, shopping, grocery stores, restaurants, a 13-Screen Ster-Kinekor cinema complex with the first IMAX with Laser to be opened in Cape Town, leather goods and audio-visual equipment. The V&A Waterfront is also still a working harbour and fishing boats bring in fresh fish, and larger container ships are towed in by tugboats.

Developments 
The Waterfront has seen development in its new Silo district, which currently houses the new headquarters of Allan Gray Investment Management at Silo 1 and apartments at Silo 2. The project was completed in 2017 with a Virgin Active gym, the Zeitz Museum of Contemporary Art Africa, and the adjoining ultra-luxury Silo Hotel.

Features in the waterfront 
 Chavonnes Battery
 Nelson Mandela Gateway to Robben Island
 Nobel Square
 Two Oceans Aquarium
 Breakwater Lodge (University of Cape Town Graduate School of Business)
 Zeitz Museum of Contemporary Art Africa
 SAS Somerset

Gallery

References

External links

Official web site
V&A Waterfront – The Story of its Development

Redeveloped ports and waterfronts
Shopping districts and streets in South Africa
Maritime history of South Africa
Suburbs of Cape Town
Tourist attractions in Cape Town
Time balls